Patrick James Grossi (born May 28, 1983), better known by his stage name Active Child, is an American singer, songwriter, and record producer. His debut album, You Are All I See, was released in 2011 and produced by Ariel Rechtshaid, and garnered substantial reviews from media outlets like Pitchfork Media and Drowned in Sound. In 2011, Active Child opened for British musician James Blake and for the French synthpop band M83. In 2012, his song, "Hanging On," was covered by English pop artist Ellie Goulding and later included on her second album, Halcyon.

Early life 
Grossi was born May 28, 1983 in Elizabeth, New Jersey, the son of Bob Grossi, a sales executive for Priority Records and Donna Grossi, an abstract and figurative painter. His father's music had been a childhood influence through the rhythms of '80s alternative dance bands like New Order and at the age of 9 he started singing with the Philadelphia Boys Choir. Grossi, at a very young age, began touring with the Philly Boys Choir in Europe, South Africa and Australia, performing at Carnegie Hall, Sydney Opera House and singing with a choir in South Africa. As a teenager, he listened to a lot of early ’90s gangster rap and focused on sports and education. During his college days in Colorado, the local arts landscape influenced him to pick up guitar and harp and rediscover his musical talent. He combined elements learned as a child and during his time with Philly Boys Choir, with his falsetto, live harp, and evocative lyrics and debuted in 2010 as Active Child.

Career

2010: Career beginnings 
Grossi's first release was Sun Rooms, a cassette put out on January 14, 2010 by Mirror Universe Tapes. That same year, came a 7" vinyl single, She Was A Vision, which was released in February 2010 via Transparent. The record includes the single She Was A Vision and b-side Voice of an Old Friend. His first official EP, Curtis Lane EP was released in June 2010, The Guardian remarked how the sombre young man creates glacial and gloomy music, and how the songs have a sort of spiritual quality. Pitchfork wrote, Grossi seems to have pushed the cosmic, stately side of these tracks to the forefront.

2011–present 
Grossi released his debut LP, You Are All I See in August 2011, featuring tracks such as Hanging On and Johnny Belinda. Drowned in Sound remarked, "You Are All I See is all about the shimmer, Grossi's touch is so deft, and the sound so seemingly in tune with the natural world, he somehow is able to play with light." By 2013, he released albums and EPs for labels including Vagrant, Spunk, Plancha and others. Several of his tracks have appeared on compilations and in multiple films including Divergent and The Host.

In August 2011, Active Child appeared on NPR Music Mondays and in 2012, he appeared on a mixtape, I Like Boys Who Cry with Charli XCX. Later in the year, he appeared in a compilation, The Singles with Lana Del Rey, PRAY with Gilbere Forte and Classixx debut album Hanging Gardens. His second single album, Mercy was released in June 2015 by Vagrant and produced by Van Rivers. Spin magazine described the album as "heartbreaking and luxurious " with Pitchfork remarking that his vocals on the record are "astonishing, like a rising updraft". His track "Painted Staircase" was featured in the official trailer of the Apple TV+ series, Defending Jacob (2020).

Tours 
Around 2010, Grossi embarked on his first support tour with White Rabbits playing shows throughout the UK and Europe. In 2011 Grossi announced he would be undertaking another American tour in November with M83. He announced tour dates to support U.K. electronic musician James Blake; in May 2011, the tour included a stop at Chicago's Lincoln Hall and New York's Bowery Ballroom. The Los Angeles Times described his live performance as "one of the most original and ambitious sounds in Los Angeles". In February 2012, he announced a headline spring tour where after jaunting across the UK and Europe in February and March, Grossi landed stateside for a series of shows running from April 27 in Pomona, CA to May 22 in Salt Lake City, UT. Grossi was supported for the U.S. leg by alt-singer Balam Acab. In May 2015, he again toured United States, at Lighting in a Bottle Festival opening at Bradley, CA, the tour was completed in nearly two months at The Cathedral Sanctuary at Immanuel Presbyterian in Los Angeles, CA.

Major festivals 
Since 2010, Grossi has been touring consistently in the States as well as overseas, including performances at the Latitude Festival in 2010, Fun Fun Fun Fest in 2011 and Montreux Jazz Festival in 2012. Some of his major live performances at the festivals are
 Latitude 2010
 Mioogfest 2011
 Hove Fest 2012
 Fun Fun Fun Fest 2011 2013
 Symbiosis Gathering 2013
 St Jerome Laneway 2012
 Sasquatch Festival 2012
 Metropolis Festival 2012
 Montreux Jazz Fest 2012
 Melbourne Arts Festival 2013
 Lightning in a Bottle 2015

Discography

Studio albums 
You Are All I See (2011, Vagrant Records)

Mercy (2015, Vagrant Records)
In Another Life (2020, Sony Music)

EPs 
 "Curtis Lane" (Merok Records, 2010)

 "Sun Rooms" (2010)

 "Rapor" (2013)

Remix 
 Steve Mason – Lost and Found
 Wolf Gang – Back To Back
 Marina and The Diamonds- "OH NO!"
 School of Seven Bells – Heart is Strange
 Hannah Cohen – Crying Game
 Angus and Julia Stone – It's all okay
 Angus and Julia Stone – Heartbreak 
 Lana Del Rey – Ride

Compilations 
 Molotov Cocktail: A Spunk Sampler, 2010
 LSTN #10, 2010
 Adult Swim Singles Program 2011 (2011, Williams Street Productions) features "Hanging On"
 #99, 2011
 Triple J's Like a Version Eight, 2012
 Un automne, 2012
 Cyclonic Footsteps: Spunk Sampler 2013
 LUXE (2017, Williams Street Productions) features "Cruel World"

References

External links 
 
 

American indie pop musicians
Shoegaze musicians
American new wave musicians
Ambient musicians
Dream pop musical groups
People from Elizabeth, New Jersey
Singers from New Jersey
1983 births
Living people